Polt is a surname. Notable people with the surname include:

Gerhard Polt (born 1942), German writer, filmmaker, actor and satirical cabaret artist
Michael C. Polt (born 1954), American diplomat
Péter Polt (born 1955), Hungarian jurist
Richard Polt (born 1964), American Philosophy professor

See also 

 Sypolt